Valentín Perales (born 2 August 1995) is an Argentine professional footballer who plays as a centre-back for Independiente Rivadavia.

Career
Perales began in Cipolletti's ranks, the defender featured eighteen times in the 2012–13 Torneo Argentino A; his debut came on 26 August 2012 against Defensores de Belgrano, while he also scored his first goal in a game with Santamarina on 25 November. At the end of 2012–13, Perales was signed by Argentine Primera División side San Lorenzo. In February 2015, after no appearances, Perales rejoined Cipolletti on loan. One goal in thirty-two games followed. On 7 July 2016, Perales joined Deportivo Morón of Primera B Metropolitana. He scored in their final match of their promotion-winning season of 2016–17 versus Deportivo Riestra.

Career statistics
.

Honours
Deportivo Morón
Primera B Metropolitana: 2016–17

References

External links

1995 births
Living people
People from Cipolletti
Argentine footballers
Association football defenders
Torneo Argentino A players
Torneo Federal A players
Primera B Metropolitana players
Primera Nacional players
Club Cipolletti footballers
San Lorenzo de Almagro footballers
Deportivo Morón footballers
Club Atlético Atlanta footballers
Independiente Rivadavia footballers